Victor Bernard King (born July 16, 1957) is an American former professional basketball player. He played collegiately for the Louisiana Tech Bulldogs, where he was a four-year starter and two-time All-Southland Conference selection during his final two seasons. He was selected by the Los Angeles Lakers as the 39th overall pick in the 1979 NBA draft but never played in the National Basketball Association (NBA).

King played for the Maine Lumberjacks of the Continental Basketball Association (CBA) during the 1980–81 season. He played alongside fellow 1979 draftee Andrew Fields for the Toyota Super Diesels of the Philippine Basketball Association (PBA) during the 1981 season, winning the Open Conference championship. King also played in Europe.

Two of King's sons, Bernard King and Kourtney Roberson, are professional basketball players.

Career statistics

College

|-
| style="text-align:left;"| 1975–76
| style="text-align:left;"| Louisiana Tech
| 26 || – || – || .543 || – || .653 || 5.7 || – || – || – || 9.7
|-
| style="text-align:left;"| 1976–77
| style="text-align:left;"| Louisiana Tech
| 26 || – || – || .585 || – || .685 || 5.7 || .8 || .2 || .4 || 11.6
|-
| style="text-align:left;"| 1977–78
| style="text-align:left;"| Louisiana Tech
| 21 || – || – || .533 || – || .684 || 7.9 || .8 || .5 || .6 || 17.0
|-
| style="text-align:left;"| 1978–79
| style="text-align:left;"| Louisiana Tech
| 25 || – || – || .622 || – || .717 || 6.6 || – || – || – || 20.4
|- class="sortbottom"
| style="text-align:center;" colspan="2"| Career
| 98 || – || – || .574 || – || .693 || 6.4 || .8 || .3 || .5 || 14.5

References

External links
College statistics

1957 births
Living people
African-American basketball players
American expatriate basketball people in the Philippines
American men's basketball players
Basketball players from Louisiana
Los Angeles Lakers draft picks
Louisiana Tech Bulldogs basketball players
Maine Lumberjacks players
People from Newellton, Louisiana
Power forwards (basketball)
Toyota Super Corollas players
21st-century African-American people
20th-century African-American sportspeople